Orange Ball (オレンジボール), an indies mini-album, was Orange Range's first release. It was originally released nationally on February 22, 2002 and an Okinawa-only release was released on April 21, 2002. Kirikirimai was later rerecorded and released on their album 1st Contact.

Track listing
Soujuuko (奏重鼓)
Gadget Groove (ガジェットグルーヴ)
Kirikirimai (キリキリマイ)
Flower Garden (フラワーガーデン)
Chuudoku (中毒)
Velocity (ベロシティー)
Funk Tune (ファンクテューン)
Soujuuko: RKDRMX- (奏重鼓)

2002 albums
Orange Range albums